Aaron Jon Wallace Jr. (born July 8, 1993) is a former American football outside linebacker. He played high school football at Rancho Bernardo High School and college football for the UCLA Bruins.

Professional career

Tennessee Titans
Wallace was drafted by the Tennessee Titans in the seventh round (222nd overall) of the 2016 NFL Draft. On May 9, 2016, he signed a four-year contract with the Titans. 
During the 2016 season, Wallace appeared in 10 games, tallying 15 tackles and one sack.

On September 20, 2017, Wallace was placed on injured reserve with a back injury.

On September 18, 2018, Wallace was waived by the Titans.

Cincinnati Bengals
On November 20, 2018, Wallace was signed to the Cincinnati Bengals practice squad.

Denver Broncos
On December 28, 2018, Wallace was signed by the Denver Broncos off the Bengals' practice squad.

On August 21, 2019, Wallace was waived/injured by the Broncos and placed on injured reserve. He was released on August 28.

References

1993 births
Living people
American football linebackers
Cincinnati Bengals players
Denver Broncos players
Players of American football from San Diego
Tennessee Titans players
UCLA Bruins football players
Rancho Bernardo High School alumni